Naşit Özcan (1886 – 26 April 1943) was a Turkish theater actor known for his performance of the "İbish" character.

Biography 
Özcan was born in 1886 in Istanbul Shehzadebashı. After studying at Bayezit High School, he completed his education at the Mızıka-ı Humayun. He had two children, Adile Naşit and Selim Nashit Ozcan, who both followed in their father's career.

Films and plays 

Haremağası Ut Meşkediyor
Meşrutiyeti Osmaniye
Bir Millet Uyanıyor
İstanbul Sokaklarında
Naşit Dolandırıcı
Düğün Gecesi
Beyimin Tiyatro Merakı
Yahudi Doktorun Metresi
İstanbul Çapkını
Çifte Köy Düğünü

References 

1886 births
1943 deaths
Date of birth missing
Date of death missing
Male actors from Istanbul
Place of death missing
Turkish male film actors
Turkish male stage actors